Crassispira mayaguanaensis is a species of sea snail, a marine gastropod mollusk in the family Pseudomelatomidae.

References

 Fallon P.J. (2011) Descriptions and illustrations of some new and poorly known turrids (Turridae) of the tropical northwestern Atlantic. Part 2. Genus Crassispira Swainson, 1840, subgenera Monilispira Bartsch & Rehder, 1939 and Dallspira Bartsch, 1950. The Nautilus 125(1): 15-28

mayaguanaensis
Gastropods described in 2011